Luke Livingstone Macassey (1843 – 9 May 1908) was an Irish civil engineer and barrister, notable for his contributions to public health by improving the water supply in the north of Ireland (today Northern Ireland). In 1874 he was appointed consultant hydraulic engineer by the Belfast Water Commissioners in which capacity he was instrumental in finding new sources of water for the expanding city of Belfast. He proposed use of a 9,000-acre (3,600 ha) catchment area in the Mourne Mountains and a three stage project:

 The first stage was to divert water from the Kilkeel and Annalong rivers through the newly constructed Mourne Conduit to a reservoir at Carryduff. These water pipes were capable of supplying 10 million imperial gallons (45,000 m3) of water per day. Work was completed in 1901.
 The second stage was to build a storage reservoir, the Silent Valley Reservoir, across the Kilkeel River. Design work on this phase began in 1910, but procurement of the work was delayed by World War I. A contract was eventually awarded in 1923 to S. Pearson & Son and work continued until 1933.
 The third stage was planned to be another storage reservoir in Annalong to impound the Annalong River. However, after the difficulties encountered in building the Silent Valley dam this second dam was not built.

He also was the first to propose a direct rail link connecting Scotland with Ireland.

Macassey is the subject of an Ulster History Circle blue plaque in Belfast.

Selected publications
 Report of the proposed Railway Tunnel between Scotland and Ireland. With plan, etc. Belfast, 1868. (With Scott William)
 Hints on the Water Supply of Small Towns and Villages. London & Belfast, 1877.
 The Law relating to Civil Engineers, Architects and Contractors. Primarily intended for their own use. Stevens & Sons, London, 1890. (With James Andrew Strahan)

References 

1843 births
1908 deaths
Irish civil engineers
Irish barristers
Hydraulic engineers
Belfast City and District Water Commissioners